This is a list of films which have placed number one at the weekend box office in Canada during 2005.

Weekend gross list

References

See also
List of American films — American films by year

Canada
2005
2005 in Canadian cinema